Arbeitseinsatz was a forced labour category of internment within Nazi Germany during World War II. When German men were called up for military service, Nazi German authorities rounded up civilians to fill in the vacancies and to expand manufacturing operations. Some labourers came from Germany but exponentially more from roundups (łapanka) in the German-occupied territories. Arbeitseinsatz was not restricted to the industry sector and to arms producing factories; it also took place, for example, in the farming sector, community services, and even in the churches.

Labour categories
There were many affected populations who could be grouped by various (often overlapping) variables such as geographic, ethnic, religious, political, and health categories. They included German political prisoners of the SA, Gestapo, and SS; foreign civilian men and women from occupied territories of Eastern Europe (Ostarbeiter); prisoners of war; institutionalized people (mentally or physically disabled people, or medical and psychiatric patients); and various ethnic, religious, or ethnoreligious groupings (for example, Jews, Sinti, Romani, Yeniche, and Jehovah's Witnesses). They lived in various kinds of camps, called labor camps (Arbeitslager in German) and concentration camps (Konzentrationslager [KZ] in German). Nazi concentration camps were often meant not only for forced labor but also extermination. In 1945 about 7.7 million workers in the German industry were of non-German origin. Many of them were very young, and about half of them were women.

Archival photographs

Notes

External links
  Forced Laborers in the "Third Reich" by Ulrich Herbert
  Interest Group for Former Forced Labourers under the Nazi Regime
  German firms that used slave or forced labour during the Nazi era

Germany home front during World War II
Unfree labor during World War II
Nazi terminology
Economy of Nazi Germany

cs:Totální nasazení
de:Zwangsarbeit in der Zeit des Nationalsozialismus
nl:Arbeitseinsatz